Alexander Baker (1582–1638), was an English Jesuit.

Biography
Baker was born in Norfolk in 1582. He entered the Society of Jesus about 1610 and was professed of the four solemn vows in 1627 and visited India twice as a missionary.

Baker died on 24 August 1638 in London, where he had resided for many years. He reconciled the Rev. William Coke, a son of Sir Edward Coke, to the Catholic Church in 1615. Among the State papers is a manuscript by Baker in defence of the doctrine of Baptismal regeneration as held by Catholics, showing its difference from the opinion of Protestants.

References

1582 births
1638 deaths
17th-century English Jesuits
People from Norfolk